Hillhead subway station is a station on the Glasgow Subway, serving the Hillhead area of Glasgow, Scotland. The entrance is located on Byres Road.

This station is the nearest to Glasgow Botanic Gardens and the University of Glasgow.

The station is one of the busiest on the system with 1.86 million boardings per year. This is largely due to the shopping facilities of Byres Road and proximity to the university, which allows students to travel between campus and the city centre.

History
During the modernisation of the underground system between 1977 and 1980, Hillhead subway station went through major rebuilding. Previously the station had a single island platform serving both tracks; the station was rebuilt with a much more spacious ticket office, escalators and an additional side platform.

Hillhead is one of the stations mentioned in Cliff Hanley's song The Glasgow Underground. The song reflects the traditional local pronunciation of the name, "Hillheed".

Current layout 
There are three automated ticket machines located in the entrance way, which leads up to an information centre where passengers may buy tickets of longer duration and get more information on transport in Glasgow. Then there is the ticket office which is manned by one staff member at a time. There are six turnstiles into which a ticket must be entered in order to pass. There are three for entering and three for exiting the subway.

Two escalators and one staircase provide access to the two platforms, and maps are present to guide passengers to the correct platform for their destination.

This is the only station on the network to feature a retail unit inside the station. Beside the ticket office, there is a Costa Pronto store.

The platform features, on one side, a perspex barrier with a handrail which was built for safety reasons.

Modernisation 
Hillhead was the first station to be upgraded as part of SPT's plan to modernise the Subway at a cost of £1.5million. Under the plans, the escalators were replaced and the interior design was refreshed. Lighting and facilities for disabled people were also be improved. In addition, SPT commissioned author and artist Alasdair Gray to create a piece of public artwork for the station. The improvement work was completed in 2012.

Alasdair Gray mural
On 16 September 2012 a mural that depicts the surrounding area was unveiled in the station's foyer. The work is by Alasdair Gray, and was developed over fourteen months with artist Nichol Wheatley using ceramics. Gray stated, "The station is in the centre of Hillhead, which I know well. Kelvingrove Art Gallery and Museum, the old BBC building and Botanic Gardens had been among my favourite places since the age of eleven. I have lived and worked in the district since 1969, and I knew I would enjoy depicting it, and those who use the subway, in a symbolic and humorous way."

Past passenger numbers 
 2011/12: 1.834 million annually

References

Glasgow Subway stations
Railway stations in Great Britain opened in 1896
Railway stations located underground in the United Kingdom
Hillhead